Imagination is an album by American trombonist Curtis Fuller's Sextette recorded in 1959 and released on the Savoy label.

Reception

The Allmusic website awarded the album 4 stars stating "Although the material (other than the lone standard "Imagination") is unfamiliar, the chord changes inspire the players to create some fine solos. Easily recommended to hard bop fans lucky enough to find this album".

Track listing
All compositions by Curtis Fuller except where noted
 "Kachin" - 6:57    
 "Bang Bang" - 6:11    
 "Imagination" (Johnny Burke, Jimmy Van Heusen) - 6:50    
 "Blues de Funk" - 9:10    
 "Lido Road" - 8:23

Personnel
Curtis Fuller - trombone, arranger
Benny Golson - tenor saxophone
Thad Jones - trumpet
McCoy Tyner - piano
Jimmy Garrison - bass
Dave Bailey - drums

References 

1960 albums
Savoy Records albums
Curtis Fuller albums
Albums recorded at Van Gelder Studio